Blanca Toledano Laut (born 3 November 2000) is a Spanish synchronised swimmer.

She won a bronze medal in the free routine combination competition at the 2018 European Aquatics Championships.

Notes

References

External links
 
 
 
 

2000 births
Living people
Spanish synchronized swimmers
World Aquatics Championships medalists in synchronised swimming
Artistic swimmers at the 2019 World Aquatics Championships
European Aquatics Championships medalists in synchronised swimming
Synchronized swimmers at the 2020 Summer Olympics
Olympic synchronized swimmers of Spain
Swimmers from Madrid